The Canon de 194 GPF (Grande Puissance Filloux - "High-Power" Filloux) - was the first French tracked self-propelled gun (SPG). Designed at the end of World War I, it was a pioneering weapon with many modern features.

Design 
The vehicle was designed by colonel , deputy chief executive officer of the compagnie des forges et aciéries de la marine (Saint-Chamond). The 194 mm gun was a derivative of the 155 mm GPF and was designed at Atelier de Construction de Puteaux by Louis Filloux. The 194mm GPF gun was intended to be deployed as a heavy field gun but with the end of the war the field gun option was dropped and only half of the 200 barrels ordered were completed for use in the Saint-Chamond vehicle. A prototype of the Saint-Chamond vehicle was manufactured with a 220 mm Saint-Chamond howitzer and although this proved to be a useful weapon in trials around Verdun in 1918 the 220mm Saint-Chamond howitzer was not adopted by the French Army and the 194 mm GPF gun chosen along with the 280mm Schneider howitzer since tracked self-propelled guns were heavy and expensive vehicles and only the more powerful guns were to be used. Saint-Chamond also designed the Mortier 280 mm TR de Schneider sur affût-chenilles St Chamond. Both SPGs used the same two tracked vehicles, avant-train (lead vehicle) and affut-chenille (gun chassis). The lead vehicle carried ammunition and a  Panhard SUK4 M2 electrical generator. Both vehicles were powered by two electric motors, energy being sent to the affut by a flexible electric cable. The gun barrel was displaced at the rear of the chassis when the vehicle had to move. Compared to a contemporary British vehicle, the Gun Carrier Mark I which was a tracked vehicle upon which a field gun was sat, the Canon de 194 was much more advanced; it was driven by only one person, had hydraulic brakes and the gun had automatically adjusting recoil mechanisms and pneumatic recuperators.

Service 
Production began in April 1918. Two days before the armistice, the vehicle, without its Puteaux gun, was tested at Saint-Chamont plant. By June 1919, Saint-Chamond was still waiting for the delivery of the oscillating mass, a key component manufactured by Puteaux.

During the interwar, they served in an artillery regiment in Valence, alongside the 280 mm SPGs.

36 were still in service at the outbreak of World War II and some were captured by the invading German forces. Surviving vehicles were pressed into Wehrmacht service as the 19.4 cm Kanone 485 (f) auf Selbstfahrlafette. At least three of them were used by the Germans in Russia in about 1942. Two were used by the Italians as coastal guns near Rome under the designation Cannone da 194/32.

Germans also reused some 194mm barrels on French Mortier G de 270 Mle 1889 coastal defence mortar mountings. A small number of 19,4 cm Kanone 485/585 (f) were deployed for coastal defense in Denmark.

The only surviving example can be found at the U.S. Army Artillery Museum at Fort Sill, OK.

Related designs
Canon de 220 L mle 1917 Schneider (FAHM)
Mortier 280 mm TR de Schneider sur affût-chenilles St Chamond

References

Sources
 
Chant, Chris (2005), Artillery, Amber Books,

External links
 May 1940 propaganda video: 
 
 Photos of the exemplar at Aberdeen Proving Grounds:        
 http://www.aviarmor.net/tww2/tanks/france/gpf194.htm (text in Russian, numerous old photos)

World War I artillery of France
World War II weapons of France
Forges et Aciéries de la Marine et d'Homécourt
World War I self-propelled artillery
World War II self-propelled artillery
194 mm artillery
World War II vehicles of France